Pothanur is a panchayat town in Namakkal district in the Indian state of Tamil Nadu. It is almost a twin town of Velur, the biggest town in Paramathi-Velur taluk since too close to it.

Demographics

 India census, Pothanur had a population of 13,967. Males constitute 51% of the population and females 49%. Pothanur has an average literacy rate of 70%, higher than the national average of 59.5%: male literacy is 78%, and female literacy is 62%. In Pothanur, 9% of the population is under 6 years of age.

Education

Pothanur having one Government Higher Secondary School, two elementary school, one middle school and one college i.e.,Kandaswami kandar'college affiliated to Periyar University.

References

Cities and towns in Namakkal district

http://www.census2011.co.in/data/subdistrict/5748-paramathi-velur-namakkal-tamil-nadu.html